Flora is a former municipality in Sogn og Fjordane county, Norway. It was located in the traditional district of Sunnfjord. The administrative centre was the town of Florø, which was founded in 1860. Florø has 8,957 inhabitants (2017) and the Eikefjord area in the east has 387 inhabitants (2017).  Other village areas in the municipality included Rognaldsvåg, Stavang, Grov, Norddalsfjord, Nyttingnes, Steinhovden, and Brandsøy.

At the time of its dissolution in 2020, the  municipality was the 163rd largest by area out of the 422 municipalities in Norway. Flora was the 96th most populous municipality in Norway with a population of 11,988. The municipality's population density was, and its population had increased by 5.1% over the last decade.

The municipality stretched from inner fjords where the mountains ascend to the Ålfotbreen glacier, to the outermost islands off the mainland coast. The town at its centre had industries that developed continuously. Trade and industry in Flora were mainly fishing industry, shipyards, and supply for the oil and gas industry in the North Sea.

General information

Name

The municipality was named after the Flora farm (Old Norse Flóra) because the town of Florø was built on its land in 1860.  The name is probably derived from a Germanic root meaning 'flat' or 'even' (cf. English floor). Flora itself is the accusative/dative form of Flore, from which the names Florø and Florelandet are derived. A common misunderstanding is that the name Florø is the Danish word ø 'island' suffixed to Flora. Although not true, it almost led to the town being renamed Florøy in the 1930s.

Coat of arms
The coat of arms, originally made for the town of Florø, was granted on 19 February 1960. The arms show three silver colored herrings on a red background. The three herrings are a symbol for the great importance of herring fishing for the local development and economy.

Background
The old municipality of Kinn was established as a municipality on 1 January 1838 (see formannskapsdistrikt law). The original municipality was identical to the Kinn parish (prestegjeld) with the sub-parishes of Bru, Kinn, and Bremanger.

On 3 January 1861, the village area of Florø (population: 846) was incorporated as a ladested (port town) by royal decree, which removed it from the rural municipality of Kinn. This left Kinn with 6,531 residents. In 1864, the northern district of the municipality was separated from the Kinn parish and became the new parish of Bremanger. Then, on 1 January 1866, Bremanger (population: 1,852) became a separate municipality. After the split, Kinn was left with 4,679 inhabitants. On 1 January 1923, the municipality of Kinn was divided into three separate municipalities: the western (island) area was Kinn (population: 2,508); the central (mostly mainland) area was Bru (population: 1,560); and the southeasternmost inland area was Eikefjord (population: 929).

During the 1960s, there were many municipal mergers across Norway due to the work of the Schei Committee. On 1 January 1964, the new municipality of Flora was created upon the merger of the following areas:
the town of Florø (population: 2,040)
the parts of the municipality of Bru that were north of the Førdefjorden (population: 1,155)
the municipality of Eikefjord (population: 919)
the Steindal area of the municipality of Vevring (population: 25)
the Husefest and Breivik farms in Bremanger (population: 9)
the municipality of Kinn (population: 3,567)
After the merger, the new municipality of Flora had a total of 7,715 residents.

On 1 January 2020, Flora was merged with most of the old Vågsøy Municipality to form a new Kinn Municipality. This non-contiguous municipality is separated by the municipality of Bremanger, making it the only non-contiguous municipality in Norway.

Churches
The Church of Norway had four parishes within the municipality of Flora. It was part of the Sunnfjord prosti (deanery) in the Diocese of Bjørgvin.

Government
All municipalities in Norway, including Flora, are responsible for primary education (through 10th grade), outpatient health services, senior citizen services, unemployment and other social services, zoning, economic development, and municipal roads. Municipalities are governed by a municipal council of elected representatives, which in turn elect a mayor.  The municipality falls under the Sogn og Fjordane District Court and the Gulating Court of Appeal.

Local politics
The municipal council of Flora was made up of 31 representatives that were elected to four year terms. The party breakdown of the final municipal council was as follows:

Mayor
The mayor of a municipality in Norway is a representative of the majority party of the municipal council who is elected to lead the council. Ola Teigen of the Labour Party was elected mayor for the 2015–2019 term.

Geography

Flora is located in the western central part of Sogn og Fjordane county. To the west, it is bordered by the North Sea, to the north it is bordered by Bremanger Municipality, to the east by Gloppen Municipality, and to the south by Naustdal Municipality and Askvoll Municipality. Flora includes many islands, including Reksta, Askrova, Svanøya, Skorpa, Fanøya, Hovden, and Kinn. The municipality also includes the large lakes of Endestadvatnet, Lykkjebøvatnet, and Vassetevatnet. The Norddalsfjorden runs through the northern part of the municipality, and it is crossed by the Norddalsfjord Bridge.

Attractions

Kinn
Off the coast is the grassy island of Kinn. The area around Kinn was the central herring area in Norway for the most part of the 19th century. At the height, there lived approximately 15,000 people on Kinn and the surrounding islands in the herring season. Today, there are 15 inhabitants on Kinn.

On the island of Kinn, on the edge of the ocean lies the historic Kinn Church from the 12th century. The church, built in Romanesque style, is the oldest church in the Sunnfjord region. It has long been associated with the legend of St. Sunniva. The church choir is the oldest part of the church, and the lectern is the only preserved example of its kind in Scandinavia.

Every year during the third weekend in June, the Kinna Pageant is an historical play about love, hate, fidelity and loyalty to the church and humankind. About 150 actors take part, and audiences of several thousand tourists visit the island to watch the play.

Svanøy

Svanøya is the southernmost and greenest island in the district of Flora. The island was the district's most important trade centre last century, and exports and shipping were major activities. A stone cross memorial commemorating King Olav the Holy and a sacrificial site from the Viking Age can be found here.

The Svanøy Estate is an old seat of nobility from 1685.

Eirikstad Farm
The Saga says that the Viking King Eirik Blodøks grew up here, hence the name. It contains a museum with old farming tools. Fjord horses are bred and trained here.

Batalden Boathouse
Norway's westernmost art gallery is housed in a restored fishing building. Regular painting and drawing courses are held.

Troll Cave
Trollhola, a prehistoric cave, is located on the island of Askrova. The main cavern is the size of a cathedral, has several passages leading from it.

Rock Carvings
The site has over 300 carvings depicting both animal and human figures, some of which are 3,000 years old.

Coastal Museum

The Coastal Museum in Sogn og Fjordane county was established in 1980. The aim was to concentrate on coastal nature and culture both past and present. Old boat houses and domestic dwellings were moved from various places in the district and re-erected in Florø near the museum. The 250-year old Holmedalsjekta (coastal freighter) is Norway's oldest non-Viking ship. A large exhibition on North Sea oil, Snorreankeret, based on the Snorre platform is located in the museum.

Lighthouses

The waters around Florø are dangerous and exposed. Three lighthouses were built in the fairways to the town at an early date. Two of them, Stabben Lighthouse and Kvanhovden Lighthouse are now automated and unmanned. The third and largest, Ytterøyane Lighthouse, is still manned. There are many shallow areas in the waters west of Florø. Several shipwrecks are located beneath these waters, which attract divers.

Sports
Local sport teams include Florø TIF and Florø SK.

Notable residents
Ivar Lykke Falch Lind - Jurist and politician in Kinn and Vevring.

See also
List of former municipalities of Norway

References

External links

Municipal fact sheet from Statistics Norway 

 
Kinn
Former municipalities of Norway
1964 establishments in Norway
2020 disestablishments in Norway